Elk City may refer to:

Places in the United States:
Elk City, Idaho 
Elk City, Kansas
Elk City, Nebraska
Elk City, Oklahoma
Elk City, West Virginia

In music:
Elk City (band), an American art pop band